Dolní Hořice is a municipality and village in Tábor District in the South Bohemian Region of the Czech Republic. It has about 800 inhabitants.

Administrative parts
Villages of Chotčiny, Hartvíkov, Horní Hořice, Kladruby, Lejčkov, Mašovice, Nové Dvory, Oblajovice, Pořín, Prasetín and Radostovice are administrative parts of Dolní Hořice.

References

Villages in Tábor District